Cellulosimicrobium funkei  is a Gram-positive and aerobic bacterium from the genus of Cellulosimicrobium which is a rare opportunistic pathogen in humans.

References

Further reading

External links
Type strain of Cellulosimicrobium funkei at BacDive -  the Bacterial Diversity Metadatabase	

Micrococcales
Bacteria described in 2006